Hyda excelsa is a moth of the subfamily Arctiinae. It was described by Rothschild in 1931. It is found in Brazil.

References

Moths described in 1931
Arctiinae